Mobile infantry refers to infantry that has superior mobility to traditional infantry, the latter being expected to march into battle. Mobile infantry, on the other hand, is better equipped with vehicles for transportation to and on the battlefield. Examples include:

 Mechanized infantry, equipped with armored personnel carriers (APCs) or infantry fighting vehicles (IFVs)
 Motorized infantry, employing trucks or other vehicles, but not APCs or IFVs
 Mounted infantry, riding horses. Dragoons were originally mounted infantry
 Bicycle infantry, specifically employing bicycles for movement
 Airmobile infantry, carried by helicopter or other aircraft.

In fiction 
In the Robert A. Heinlein 1959 science fiction novel Starship Troopers, the Mobile Infantry is a separate branch of the armed forces whose soldiers wear powered exoskeletons which enable them to move faster and jump higher.  The 1997 film of the same name was based on Heinlein's story and multiple spinoffs followed.

Infantry